The 28th Legislative Assembly of Ontario was in session from October 17, 1967, until September 13, 1971, just prior to the 1971 general election. The majority party was the Ontario Progressive Conservative Party led by John Robarts.

Bill Davis succeeded Robarts as party leader and Premier in March 1971.

Frederick McIntosh Cass served as speaker for the assembly.

References 
Members in Parliament 28

Terms of the Legislative Assembly of Ontario
1967 establishments in Ontario
1971 disestablishments in Ontario